Rob Wynne (born 1948) is an American visual artist best known for his use of glass to produce abstract and text wall installations. He lives and works in New York City.

Work 
Wynne's work spans sculpture, jewelry, painting, drawing, collage, installations, design, and photography. Wynne's early drawings and collages were influenced by the Fluxus movement via Ray Johnson, a seminal figure of Neo-Dada and founder of the New York Correspondence School. Having met Johnson during the 1970s, Wynne says that "through Ray I got interested in the idea of using a typewriter and Western Union, and we developed an epistolary relationship." Wynne once went to Western Union and wrote a telegram to himself that read: "You are still alive." In the mid-1970s Wynne scored music, opera, and soundscape for the dramatic readings of Marguerite Young's epic novel Miss MacIntosh, My Darling as part of radio station WBAI's series called The Reading Experiment.

Wynne's use of industrial materials in his work, such as his Xerox art, was a part of his first installation, Sphere Redux, at The Kitchen in New York City, in 1981. It consisted of two rear screen projections of a large rotating glass marble, scored with opera and breaking glass, synchronized with video monitors arranged along the base of one wall, hung with blueprint blow-ups of glass marbles, moon rocks, and caves, intermixed with portraits of friends whose features were overshadowed by masks.

In the 1990s, Wynne's exhibitions of paintings, sculptures, and prints at the Holly Solomon Gallery became installations;  his works set against wallpaper with images from the opera La Sonnambula (Bellini)  or The Flies (Sartre).

In recent years, Wynne has become interested in glass as a medium. In the course of a visit to a glass foundry. "There", Wynne says, "I started this experiment. It was purely by accident. I was holding a ladle of molten glass when it slipped out of my hands and spilled onto the floor, making a huge splat, which was absolutely spectacular. And at that moment I thought it was a kind of cosmic explosion and that it would be so interesting to fix it permanently, silver it and see it really glimmer. That led me to realize that I could control it somewhat more than just letting it fall out of a ladle and I could start making actual letters."

Wynne began to use glass to create large scale text pieces. Wynne explained that his glass text pieces were intended to "be much more reflective so when you are reading them you see yourself reading them." Olivia Ryder for UrbanGlass writes, "He effectively reinstates that reflective nature with his literary creations. The disassociated words and phrases, adopts the viewers voice and adds a layer of introspection, disrupting the barriers between art and viewer."

In Wynne's 2018 show, Float at the Brooklyn Museum of Art, he installed sixteen works within the American Art galleries.  The works were placed in direct dialogue with selected works from the collection. Barbara A. MacAdam from the Brooklyn Rail described Wynne's installations, "The objects of the gallery—the artifacts, paintings, sculpture, and furniture are reflected upon by the artist, literally and figuratively, and become a part of his, and our, stream of consciousness."

In his work, Wynne freely appropriates fragments of texts and images taken from literature, opera, theater, and conversation. In addition to his work in glass, Wynne works with smoke, embroidery, paint, thread, bronze, and ceramics.

Solo exhibitions 
Solo exhibitions of Wynne's work include:

 Speechless, Locks Gallery, Philadelphia, PA, 2020
 Float, Brooklyn Museum, Brooklyn, NY, 2018
 OH2/H2O, GAVLAK Gallery, Palm Beach FL, 2017
 Blindsight, Arthur Roger Gallery, New Orleans, LA, 2016
 A Distant Mirror, Galerie Mitterrand, Paris, France, 2016
 Blue Ghost, 39 Great Jones, New York, NY, 2016
 The Backstage of the Universe, Gavlak Gallery, Los Angeles, CA, 2014
 The Lure of Unknown Regions Beyond the Rim of Experience, Locks Gallery, Philadelphia, PA., 2013
 The Green Ray, Gavlak Gallery, Palm Beach, Florida, 2013
 I Remember Ceramic Castles, Mermaids & Japanese Bridges, Norton Museum of Art, West Palm Beach, Florida, 2012
 Remember Me, Galerie Mitterrand, Paris, France, 2012
 Incognito, Locks Gallery, Philadelphia, PA, 2011
 Kismet, Gavlak Gallery, Palm Beach, Florida, 2009
 Like the Flickering of a Candle, Locks Gallery, Philadelphia, PA., 2008
 The Heartbeat of a Bird, Craig Starr Associates, New York City, 2006
 French Kiss, Galerie Mitterrand, Paris, France (curated), 2006
 Imitation and Disguise, Galerie Mitterrand, Paris, France, 2004
 New Work, Galerie Edward Mitterrand, Geneva, Switzerland, 2001
 You're Dreaming, Holly Solomon Gallery, New York City, 1999
 Breathe, Rebecca Ibel Gallery, Columbus Ohio, 1999
 Rob Wynne: Glass Sculpture and Word Drawings, Galerie Mitterrand, Paris, France, 1998
 Sleepwalking, Holly Solomon Gallery, New York City, 1996
 Window Shopping, Grey Art Gallery, New York University, New York City, 1994
 Sphere Redux, The Kitchen, New York City, (installation), 1981

Group exhibitions 
Selected group exhibitions include:

 Visible Traces (Mountain Water Air), Lévy Gorvy, NYC, 2019
 Something About a Tree, Curated by Linda Yablonsky, The Flag Art Foundation, New York, NY, 2013
 High Drama: Eugene Berman and the Legacy of the Melancholic Sublime, curated by Michael Duncan, traveling exhibit: Georgia Museum of Fine Art, Athens Georgia; McNay Art Museum, Austin, Texas; Long Beach Museum of Art, Long Beach, California, 2005
 Officina/America, Galleria D'arte Moderna, Bologna, Italy, (catalogue), 2002
 Slow Art: Painting in New York Now, P.S. 1 Museum, Long Island City, New York, 1992 
 About Place: Contemporary American Landscape, P.S. 1 Museum, Long Island City, New York, (catalogue), 1986

Collections 
Rob Wynne's work is held in the following public collections:

 Centre Pompidou, Paris
 The Museum of Modern Art, New York City
 The Whitney Museum of Art, New York City
 The New York Public Library, The Spencer Collection, New York City

References

1948 births
Living people
Artists from New York City
20th-century American artists
American installation artists